The 22551 / 22552 Darbhanga–Jalandhar City Antyodaya Express is an Express train belonging to East Central Railway zone that runs between  and  . It is currently being operated with 22551/22552 train numbers on a weekly basis.

Loco link
Both trains are hauled by Samastipur based WDM-3A / WDM-3D locomotive on its entire journey.

Service

Coach composition 

The trains are completely general coach trains designed by Indian Railways with features of LED screen display to show information about stations, train speed, etc. Vending machines for water are available. Bio-toilets in compartments as well as CCTV cameras and mobile charging points and toilet occupancy indicators.

Route & halts

Rake sharing

The train shares its rake with 15551/15552 Darbhanga–Varanasi City Antyodaya Express.

See also 

 Antyodaya Express
 Darbhanga Junction railway station
 Jalandhar City Junction railway station
 Bandra Terminus–Gorakhpur Antyodaya Express

Notes

References

External links
 22551/Darbhanga - Jalandhar City Antyodaya Express India Rail Info
 22552/Jalandhar City - Darbhanga Antyodaya Express India Rail Info

Antyodaya Express trains
Rail transport in Punjab, India
Rail transport in Haryana
Rail transport in Uttarakhand
Rail transport in Uttar Pradesh
Rail transport in Bihar
Transport in Darbhanga
Transport in Jalandhar
Railway services introduced in 2018